Howard Elbert "Ducky" Holmes (July 8, 1883 – September 18, 1945) was a catcher in Major League Baseball. He played in 9 games for the 1906 St. Louis Cardinals.

After his playing career, he was a manager in the minor leagues for the Sioux City Packers of the Western League (1908), the Saginaw Ducks of the Southern Michigan League (1913–1915), and the Frankfort Old Taylors of the Ohio State League (1916). He also worked as an umpire, both in the National League (1921) and American League (1923–1924). Later, he managed the Dayton Ducks of the Middle Atlantic League (1932–1938, 1941–1942). After the Dayton Ducks folded at the end of the 1942 season, Holmes worked in a grocery store until his death.

References

External links
, or Retrosheet
 

Major League Baseball catchers
St. Louis Cardinals players
Baseball players from Dayton, Ohio
Minor league baseball managers
1883 births
1945 deaths
Saginaw White Sox players
Jackson White Sox players
Savannah Pathfinders players
Indianapolis Indians players
Canton Chinamen players
Birmingham Barons players
Montreal Royals players
Sioux City Packers players
Zanesville Infants players
Zanesville Potters players
South Bend Bronchos players
South Bend Benders players
Grand Rapids Grads players
Grand Rapids Black Sox players
LaGrange Terrapins players